Bedford North Lawrence High School is a comprehensive, four-year public high school located in the eastern part of Bedford, Indiana. It is accredited by the Indiana Department of Education and North Central Association of Colleges and Schools. Established in 1974, the school consolidated seven area high schools: Bedford, Tunnelton, Shawswick, Needmore, Fayetteville, Oolitic, and Heltonville. Bedford North Lawrence is fed from Bedford and Oolitic Middle Schools, as well as the private St. Vincent de Paul School.

The school's mission is "...as a purposeful learning community that each student reaches his or her full potential."

Athletics 
The Stars have won eight IHSAA state championships.

Notable alumni
Damon Bailey, professional basketball player
Craig Bowden, professional golfer
Ken Bowersox, NASA astronaut
Aishah Hasnie, Fox News reporter
Mark Kinser, auto racer
Christopher May, member of the Indiana House of Representatives
Clayton Anderson, country music artist,

See also
 List of high schools in Indiana

References

External links
 Bedford North Lawrence High School official website

Public high schools in Indiana
Former Southern Indiana Athletic Conference members
Educational institutions established in 1974
Education in Lawrence County, Indiana
1974 establishments in Indiana